Ihab Kadhim Mhawesh Khlaifawi (born 1 July 1994) is an Iraqi professional footballer who plays as a midfielder for Iraqi Premier League club Al-Sinaa.

International career 
Ihab was called up for the 2013 FIFA U-20 World Cup and 2014 WAFF Championship.

References

External links 
 
 

1994 births
Living people
Sportspeople from Baghdad
Iraqi footballers
Association football midfielders
Al-Talaba SC players
Al-Quwa Al-Jawiya players
Zakho FC players
Iraqi Premier League players
Iraq youth international footballers
Iraq international footballers